Nama demissum is an annual flowering plant.  It is known by the common name purplemat, or purple mat.

Distribution
Purple mat, Nama demissum, grows in the American desert southwest, such as the Mojave Desert, and parts of Mexico on dry sandy or gravelly flats from 2000' to 5500' in creosote bush scrub.

Description
Nama demissum grows to three inches high in a small patch of hairy glandular herbage.  The flowers range from pinkish to purple.  It blooms from February to May.

Varieties
Nama demissum var. covillei Brand—Coville's purplemat	 
Nama demissum var. demissum Gray—purple mat, purplemat

References

External links
Jepson Manual Treatment - Nama demissum
ITIS Standard Report
Nama demissum - Photo gallery

demissum
Flora of the California desert regions
Flora of the Sonoran Deserts
Flora of the Southwestern United States
North American desert flora
Flora without expected TNC conservation status